Ferguson may refer to:

Places

Canada
Ferguson Avenue (Hamilton, Ontario)
Ferguson, British Columbia
Mount Ferguson (Ontario), a mountain in Temagami, Ontario

United States
Ferguson, a meteorite fall in North Carolina
Ferguson, Arkansas
Ferguson, Iowa
Ferguson, Kentucky
Ferguson, Missouri
Ferguson, a ghost town in South Carolina
Ferguson, West Virginia

People
 Ferguson (name)

Brands and enterprises
Ferguson Company, also known as the Ferguson-Brown Company, a tractor manufacturer
Ferguson TE20, a tractor
Ferguson Electronics, previously known as Ferguson Radio Corporation
Ferguson Enterprises, a plumbing and builder products wholesaler, subsidiary of Ferguson plc
Ferguson plc, a multinational plumbing and heating products distributor
Ferguson Publishing, an imprint of Infobase Publishing
Ferguson Research, a racecar constructor
Ferguson rifle
Ferguson Marine

Other uses
 Jack Ferguson Award, Ontario Hockey League ice hockey award
 Fergie Ferguson Award, University of Florida sports award
Ferguson Center for the Arts
Ferguson unrest, protests and civil disorder following the 2014 shooting of Michael Brown in Ferguson, Missouri
Our Lady of Ferguson, Christian icon of the Virgin Mary
Plessy v. Ferguson, 163 U.S. 537 (1896), a landmark U.S. Supreme Court decision that upheld the constitutionality of the "separate but equal" segregation doctrine

See also

 
Fergie (disambiguation)
Ferguson River (disambiguation)
Fergusson (disambiguation)